Richard Tsugio Tanabe Jr. (born December 14, 1932) is a former American competition swimmer who represented the United States at the 1956 Summer Olympics in Melbourne, Australia.  He swam for the silver medal-winning U.S. team in the preliminary heats of the men's 4×200-meter freestyle relay.  Tanabe was not eligible to receive a medal under the 1956 Olympic swimming rules, however, because he did not swim in the relay final.

Following the Olympics, Tanabe enlisted in the United States Army.  He then worked as a teacher, and high school swimming coach.

See also
 List of Indiana University (Bloomington) people

References

1932 births
Living people
American male freestyle swimmers
Indiana Hoosiers men's swimmers
Olympic swimmers of the United States
People from Hilo, Hawaii
Swimmers at the 1956 Summer Olympics
American military personnel of Japanese descent
American sportspeople of Japanese descent